This is a list of mathematical topics in classical mechanics, by Wikipedia page. See also list of variational topics, correspondence principle.

Newtonian physics

Newton's laws of motion
Inertia,

Kinematics, rigid body
Momentum, kinetic energy
Parallelogram of force 
Circular motion
Rotational speed
Angular speed
Angular momentum 
torque
angular acceleration
moment of inertia
parallel axes rule
perpendicular axes rule
stretch rule
centripetal force, centrifugal force, Reactive centrifugal force
Laplace–Runge–Lenz vector
Euler's disk
elastic potential energy
Mechanical equilibrium
D'Alembert's principle
Degrees of freedom (physics and chemistry)
Frame of reference
Inertial frame of reference
Galilean transformation
Principle of relativity

Conservation laws

Conservation of momentum
Conservation of linear momentum
Conservation of angular momentum
Conservation of energy
Potential energy
Conservative force
Conservation of mass

Law of universal gravitation

Projectile motion
Kepler's laws of planetary motion
Escape velocity
Potential well
Weightlessness
Lagrangian point
N-body problem
Kolmogorov-Arnold-Moser theorem
Virial theorem
Gravitational binding energy
Speed of gravity
Newtonian limit
Hill sphere
Roche lobe
Roche limit

Hamiltonian mechanics

Phase space
Symplectic manifold
Liouville's theorem (Hamiltonian)
Poisson bracket
Poisson algebra
Poisson manifold
Antibracket algebra
Hamiltonian constraint
Moment map
Contact geometry
Analysis of flows
Nambu mechanics

Lagrangian mechanics

Action (physics)
Lagrangian
Euler–Lagrange equations
Noether's theorem

Classical mechanics